Coyote brown, also known as nutria, is a color, often used in military camouflage.  Coyote brown belongs to the dull yellow color subspectrum.

See also
List of colors
MARPAT
MultiCam

References

Shades of brown
Shades of yellow